Allis may refer to:

People 
 Allis (surname)

Places 
 Allis Township, Michigan
 North Allis Township, Michigan
 West Allis, Wisconsin

Other 
 Allis-Chalmers, a former manufacturer of farm equipment based in Milwaukee, Wisconsin
 Big Allis, a giant generator in Queens, New York, commissioned by Consolidated Edison and built by Allis-Chalmers in 1965
 Allis-Chalmers Model B, popular tractor manufactured by Allis-Chalmers
 Charles Allis Art Museum, in Milwaukee, Wisconsin
 Allis shad, Alosa alosa, species of fish found in Europe and North Africa
 Fiat Allis, manufacturer of construction equipment
 Allis clamp, a vital surgical instrument used in many surgical procedures

See also 
 Alliss
 Alis (disambiguation)
 Alice (disambiguation)